Nelu Stănescu (4 August 1957 - 11 March 2004) was a Romanian football left defender.

Club career
Nelu Stănescu was born on 1 January 1956 in Babadag, Romania. He was a left defender and started playing football in the lower leagues at Granitul Babadag and Delta Tulcea. In 1979 he was transferred to Dinamo București where on 2 September 1979 he made his Divizia A debut in a 2–0 victory against Olimpia Satu Mare. From 1981 until 1984 Dinamo won three consecutive Divizia A titles, in the first he appeared in 28 matches, in the second he played 14 games and in the third he made 26 appearances and scored two goals. Stănescu also won three Cupa României with the Red Dogs and appeared in 18 matches in European competitions, including appearing in 6 games in the 1983–84 European Cup season, as the club reached the semi-finals. After eight seasons in which he scored 4 goals in 163 Divizia A matches for Dinamo, he was transferred at Flacăra Moreni where he made his last Divizia A appearance on 3 December 1988 in a 2–0 victory against ASA Târgu Mureș, having a total of 189 Divizia A matches in which he scored 4 goals. Nelu Stănescu spent the last years of his career playing for Delta Tulcea and Olimpia Râmnicu Sărat in Divizia B. On 11 March 2004, Stănescu died at age 46 in his native Babadag.

International career
Nelu Stănescu played six games at international level for Romania, making his debut on 11 November 1981 under coach Mircea Lucescu in a qualification match for the 1982 World Cup against Switzerland which ended 0–0. His following games played for the national team were friendlies, his last appearance taking place on 30 March 1988 in a 3–3 against East Germany.

Honours
Dinamo București
Divizia A: 1981–82, 1982–83, 1983–84
Cupa României: 1981–82, 1983–84, 1985–86

References

1957 births
2004 deaths
Romanian footballers
Romania international footballers
Association football defenders
Liga I players
Liga II players
FC Delta Dobrogea Tulcea players
FC Dinamo București players
CSM Flacăra Moreni players